WeatherGard is an Farmington, Michigan based window manufacturer which provides window, door, insulation, roofing, gutter, and siding installation services to customers in Michigan's Lower Peninsula from its offices in Oak Park, Lansing and Grand Rapids.

History

WeatherGard was founded as WeatherGard Window Company, Inc by Albert BenEzra on September 13, 1988 in Detroit, Michigan. BenEzra, who had been in the door industry for over a decade realized he could expand his business by manufacturing windows. Basing his design on British manufacturing techniques WeatherGard became the first Michigan window manufacturer to introduce four point welding, and first to offer painted exterior colors. WeatherGard would later expand its operations, moving to its location to Oak Park in 1995 and introducing insulation, roofing, gutter, and siding installation services. WeatherGard focuses primarily on residential services, but has also taken part in commercial work such the restoration of the historic Alden Park Towers in Detroit.

Awards 
In 2015 WeatherGard received an Excellence in Energy Efficiency Award from Consumers Energy.

References

External links
 WeatherGard Official site

Manufacturing companies based in Michigan
Manufacturing companies established in 1988
Privately held companies based in Michigan
Window manufacturers